The Revenge of Roger (French: La revanche de Roger la Honte) is a 1946 French historical crime film directed by André Cayatte and starring Lucien Coëdel, María Casares and Paul Bernard. The film is based on a novel by Jules Mary. It was a sequel to the film Roger la Honte also directed by Cayatte which had been shot in 1945 but was released in 1946. The film's sets were designed by the art director Jacques Colombier.

Main cast
 Lucien Coëdel as William Farnell / Roger Laroque  
 María Casares as Julia de Terrenoire  
 Paul Bernard as Luversan  
 Paulette Dubost as Victoire  
 Louis Salou as Le commissaire Lacroix  
 Rellys as Tristot  
 André Gabriello as Pivolot  
 Jean Tissier as Le baron de Cé  
 Jean Desailly as Raymond de Noirville 
 Simone Valère as Suzanne Laroque

References

Bibliography 
 Goble, Alan. The Complete Index to Literary Sources in Film. Walter de Gruyter, 1999.

External links 
 

1946 films
French crime films
French historical films
1940s crime films
1940s historical films
1940s French-language films
Films directed by André Cayatte
Films set in the 19th century
French sequel films
French black-and-white films
1940s French films